Greta andromica, the Andromica clearwing, is an ithomiine butterfly from the subfamily Ithomiinae. It was described by William Chapman Hewitson in 1854.

Subspecies

Greta andromica andromica (Venezuela)
Greta andromica andania Hopffer, 1874   (Ecuador, Peru)
Greta andromica dromica Haensch, 1909  (Colombia)
Greta andromica lyra Salvin, 1869  (Guatemala to Panama)
Greta andromica nerina (Haensch, 1905) (Colombia)
Greta andromica trifenestra Fox, 1941  (Trinidad)

References

External links

"Greta andromica Hewitson, 1854" at the Global Biodiversity Information Facility, with images and a range map.

Ithomiini
Butterflies of Central America
Nymphalidae of South America
Lepidoptera of Bolivia
Lepidoptera of Brazil
Lepidoptera of Colombia
Lepidoptera of Ecuador
Butterflies of North America
Lepidoptera of Peru
Invertebrates of Trinidad and Tobago
Lepidoptera of Venezuela
Butterflies described in 1854